Meisdorf is a village in the town of Falkenstein/Harz in the district of Harz in the German state of Saxony-Anhalt.

Location 
The River Selke flows through it and forms a valley (Selketal) in the Lower Harz and Mansfeld Land. Southwest of Meisdorf above the river lies the ruins of Anhalt Castle, the preserved medieval castle of Falkenstein and the sites of Old Falkenstein Castle and the Ackeburg.

References

Literature 
 Sven Frotscher: Burg Falkenstein und Schloß Meisdorf. Ed. Leipzig, Leipzig, 1995, 
 Heimatverein Meisdorf (ed.): Chronik der Gemeinde Meisdorf. Meisdorf, 2005 (self-publication)

External links 

 Meisdorf at falkenstein-harz.de
 Meisdorf at heimatverein-meisdorf.de

Falkenstein, Saxony-Anhalt
Former municipalities in Saxony-Anhalt